André Chavet (13 July 1930 – 6 June 2005) was a French basketball player. He competed in the men's tournament at the 1952 Summer Olympics.

References

1930 births
2005 deaths
French men's basketball players
Olympic basketball players of France
Basketball players at the 1952 Summer Olympics
Sportspeople from Saint-Étienne